Bugi is a village in Warmian-Masurian Voivodeship, Poland.

Bugi may also refer to:
Lontara alphabet, ISO 15924 code Bugi 
Buginese language, an Indonesian language also known as Bugi
Agob language, a Papuan language
Nambu language, a Papuan language
Saint Bugi, 6th century Welsh Christian saint 
Kensei: Sacred Fist, a fighting video game known as Bugi in Japan

See also 
Bugis (disambiguation)
Boogie (disambiguation)